Shotgun Pass is a 1931 American Western film directed by J.P. McGowan and starring Tim McCoy, Virginia Lee Corbin and Monte Vandergrift.

Plot
Brothers Jake and Spider Mitchell conflict with Walker over access to land that he has rented from his girlfriend's father. They first try to charge a toll, then try to kill the real owner, and finally begin to build a fence. Walker's sidekick, Sagebrush, dynamites the fence, and a resulting stampede of horses kills the brothers.

Cast
 Tim McCoy as Tim Walker 
 Virginia Lee Corbin as Sally Seagrue 
 Monte Vandergrift as Jake Mitchell 
 Frank Rice as Sagebrush 
 Joe Smith Marba as Spider Mitchell
 Dick Stewart as Lon Seagrue 
 Ben Corbett as Shorty 
 Harry Todd as Sheriff Pete

References

Bibliography
 Pitts, Michael R. Western Movies: A Guide to 5,105 Feature Films. McFarland, 2012.

External links
 

1931 films
1931 Western (genre) films
American Western (genre) films
Films directed by J. P. McGowan
Columbia Pictures films
American black-and-white films
1930s English-language films
1930s American films